Fan Chan (Thai: แฟนฉัน, English: My Girl) is a 2003 Thai coming-of-age romantic film. It presents a nostalgic look back at the childhood friendship of a boy and girl growing up in a small town in Thailand in the 1980s, featuring a soundtrack of Thai pop music of the era. It was the debut film of six young screenwriter-directors: Vitcha Gojiew, Songyos Sugmakanan, Nithiwat Tharathorn, Witthaya Thongyooyong, Anusorn Trisirikasem and Komgrit Triwimol. Fan Chan was the top domestic film at the Thailand box office in 2003, earning 140 million baht.

Plot
Jeab, a young man working in Bangkok, receives word that his best friend from childhood, Noi-Naa is to be married. While driving back to his hometown, the memories of his friendship with her come flooding back, and their story is told in a flashback.

Jeab and Noi-Naa live in a small city somewhere in Phetchaburi in southern Thailand. Their fathers are rival barbers, with shops situated next to each other, with only a mini-mart to separate them. Jeab's father favors efficiency and uses an electric trimmer. Noi-Naa's father, meanwhile, has a more contemplative, artistic approach, and uses scissors. Jeab notes that the results of both methods seem to be the same.

The school holiday has ended. Jeab is notorious for oversleeping, so that each day he misses the school bus and must be driven part way by his father on a motorcycle. By taking a shortcut, Jeab and his father are able to catch up to the bus, but only just in time.

On the bus, other boys are introduced. Their ringleader is an overweight bully named Jack. On the bus, the children talk about what they are going to do after school. The boys decide they will play Chinese fantasy characters, while the girls plan to play "house".

Because Jeab must cross a busy street to play with the boys, and he fears getting hit by a car, he stays to play with the girls, which makes him the target of much taunting by Jack and the other boys.

Then, one day, Jack and his friends are playing soccer against a rival neighborhood gang. They are one player short. Jeab happens to be hanging around, and he's asked to join the game, proving his abilities.

He earns the trust of Jack's gang, and passes various tests in order to join. But the one thing he must do is sever his ties to Noi-Naa. Jeab does so, quite literally, by cutting a rubber-band jump rope, which Noi-Naa is skilled at playing with.

From that moment on, Noi-Naa refuses to talk to Jeab. Then, one day, Jeab gets word that Noi-Naa is moving away. And, of course, on the day she is to leave, Jeab oversleeps and misses the chance to say his final goodbye to Noi-Naa. Jeab then gets Jack and his friends to commandeer a delivery motorcycle and pursue Noi-Naa and her family in their moving truck. But the motorcycle breaks down, and the truck rolls out of sight. Jeab is to never see Noi-Naa again ... until her wedding.

Cast
Charlie Trairat as Jeab 
Focus Jirakul as Noi-Naa 
Charwin Jitsomboon as Jeab (adult) 
Wongsakorn Rassamitat as Jeab's father 
Arnudsara Jantarangsri as Jeab's mother
Nipawan Taveepornsawan as Noi-Naa's mother 
Prem Tinsulanonda as Himself (on television)
Aphichan Chaleumchainuwong as Dtee
Preecha Chanapai as Noi-Naa's father
Anyarit Pitakkul as Boy 
Yok Teeranitayatarn as Manoj
Chaleumpol Tikumpornteerawong as Jack
Thana Vichayasuranan as Prik

Trivia

Preecha Chanapai (also known as Lek Carabao of the band Carabao), who portrayed Noi-Naa's long-haired, moustachioed father, reprised his role of a barber in Dear Dakanda, a 2005 film directed by one of the six Fan Chan directors, Komgrit Triwimol. In 1984, he made his film debut in Yud Huajai Wai Tee Rak with Arnudsara Jantarangsri who plays Jeab's mother this film.
For Arnudsara Jantarangsri, in this film she also reunited with Wongsakorn Rassamitat which they both performed together in Siam Square, her second film after Yud Huajai Wai Tee Rak in same year.
Fan Chan was released in Indonesia in 2006 as First Love, with a soundtrack dubbed in Indonesian and featuring the country's pop music of the era.

Cites

External links
 

2003 films
2003 romantic comedy films
GMM Tai Hub films
Thai-language films
Thai romantic comedy films
Thai national heritage films
2003 directorial debut films